The year 2002 is the 6th year in the history of the Pride Fighting Championships, a mixed martial arts promotion based in Japan. 2002 had 10 events beginning with, Pride FC: The Best, Vol. 1.

Title fights

Debut Pride FC fighters

The following fighters fought their first Pride FC fight in 2002:

 Achmed Labasanov
 Aji Susilo
 Akira Nitagai
 Alistair Overeem
 Anderson Silva
 Andrei Kopylov
 Antônio Rogério Nogueira
 Bazigit Atajev
 Bob Sapp
 Daisuke Nakamura
 Daniel Gracie
 Demetrius Gioulacos
 Eiji Mitsuoka
 Fatih Kocamis
 Fedor Emelianenko
 Gilles Arsene
 Han Ten Yun
 Hidehiko Yoshida
 Hidehisa Matsuda

 Hiromitsu Kanehara
 Hirotaka Yokoi
 Jerrel Venetiaan
 Joe Son
 John Alessio
 Jong Wang Kim
 Jukei Nakajima
 Kazuki Okubo
 Ken Orihashi
 Kenichi Yamamoto
 Kestutis Smirnovas
 Kevin Randleman
 Kiyoshi Tamura
 Kyosuke Sasaki
 Lloyd Van Dams
 Paulo Filho
 Ron Waterman
 Rory Singer
 Scott Bills

 Shinichiro Takamura
 Sokun Koh
 Steve White
 Takahiro Oba
 Takashi Sugiura
 Tatsuya Iwasaki
 Tim Catalfo
 Togo Togo
 Tomohiko Hashimoto
 Xue Do Won
 Yoshinori Kawakami
 Yoshinori Sasaki
 Yuji Hisamatsu
 Yuki Sasaki
 Yukiya Naito
 Yuriy Kochkine
 Yushin Okami
 Yusuke Imamura
 Yutaro Miyamoto

Events list

Pride FC: The Best, Vol. 1

Pride FC: The Best, Vol. 1 was an event held on February 22, 2002 at the Korakuen Hall in Tokyo, Japan.

Results

Pride 19: Bad Blood

Pride 19: Bad Blood was an event held on February 24, 2002 at the Saitama Super Arena in Saitama, Japan.

Results

Pride 20: Armed and Ready

Pride 20: Armed and Ready was an event held on April 28, 2002 at the Yokohama Arena in Yokohama, Japan.

Results

Pride 21: Demolition

Pride 21: Demolition was an event held on June 23, 2002 at the Saitama Super Arena in Saitama, Japan. This event featured the PRIDE debut of MMA all-time greats Fedor Emelianenko and Anderson Silva.

Results

Pride FC: The Best, Vol. 2

Pride FC: The Best, Vol. 2 was an event held on July 20, 2002 at the Differ Ariake Arena in Tokyo, Japan.

Results

Pride FC: Shockwave

Pride FC: Shockwave was an event held on August 28, 2002 at the Tokyo National Stadium in Tokyo, Japan. The event was co-promoted by the PRIDE Fighting Championships and K-1

Results

Pride 22: Beasts from the East 2

Pride 22: Beasts from the East 2 was an event held on September 29, 2002 at the Nagoya Rainbow Hall in Nagoya, Japan. It featured the Pride debut of former UFC Heavyweight Champion Kevin Randleman

Results

Pride FC: The Best, Vol. 3

Pride FC: The Best, Vol. 3 was an event held on October 20, 2002 at the Differ Ariake Arena in Tokyo, Japan.

Results

Pride 23: Championship Chaos 2

Pride 23: Championship Chaos 2 was an event held on November 24, 2002 at the Tokyo Dome in Tokyo, Japan.

Results

Pride 24: Cold Fury 3

Pride 24: Cold Fury 3 was an event held on December 23, 2002 at the Marine Messe Fukuoka in Fukuoka, Japan.

Results

See also
 Pride Fighting Championships
 List of Pride Fighting Championships champions
 List of Pride Fighting events

References

Pride Fighting Championships events
2002 in mixed martial arts